Komadavole is an out growth of Eluru city in Eluru district of the Indian state of Andhra Pradesh. It is located in Eluru mandal of Eluru revenue division. It is also a constituent of Eluru Urban Agglomeration.

Geography

It is located on the north side of Kolleru lake.

Demographics 

The average literacy rate stands at 69.60 percent.

Transportation

APSRTC runs buses from Eluru and Rajahmundry to this region.

References

Neighbourhoods in Eluru
Geography of Eluru district